Lugalnamniršumma was an ancient Iraqi ruler. He ruled sometime during the Early Dynastic IIIb period; additionally, temp. Akalamdug, Urnanshe, Akurgal, Paraganedu, and Ennail. Ursangpae may have preceded Lugalnamniršumma as a king of Uruk. Lugalnamniršumma may have also been succeeded by Lugalsilâsi I as a great king of Kish.

References

Notes

Citations

Sources

Bibliography

Further reading

External links

25th-century BC Sumerian kings
Kings of Kish